Albert George Uytenbogaardt (born 5 March 1930) is a former South African footballer who played as a goalkeeper.

Uytenbogaardt moved to England and signed for Charlton Athletic in 1948. He made his senior debut on 18 December 1948 in a 4–1 home win against Stoke City. He mainly served as backup to established first choice keeper Sam Bartram, and his first team opportunities were severely limited. He made six Football League appearances in five seasons at the club, but is notably also credited for scoring a goal for the club in a reserve team game. He later returned to his home country to play for Cape Town City.

Uytenbogaardt also represented the South African national team from 1955 to 1957.

References

1930 births
Living people
Soccer players from Cape Town
South African soccer players
Association football goalkeepers
English Football League players
Charlton Athletic F.C. players
Cape Town City F.C. (NFL) players
Hellenic F.C. players
Expatriate footballers in England
South African expatriate soccer players
South Africa international soccer players
National Football League (South Africa) players